Sled dog racing (sometimes termed dog sled racing) is a winter dog sport most popular in the Arctic regions of the United States, Canada, Russia, Greenland and some European countries. It involves the timed competition of teams of sled dogs that pull a sled with the dog driver or musher standing on the runners. The team completing the marked course in the least time is judged the winner.

A sled dog race was a demonstration sport at the 1932 Winter Olympics in Lake Placid, New York and again at the 1952 Winter Olympics in Oslo, and once more in the 1994 Winter Olympics in Lillehammer, but it did not gain official event status.

Sled dogs, known also as sleighman dogs, sledge dogs, or sleddogs, are a highly trained dog type that are used to pull a dog sled, a wheel-less vehicle on runners, over snow or ice, by means of harnesses and lines.

History

The first recorded sled race in North America took place in 1908 in Alaska, the All Alaska Sweepstakes.  It ran 400 miles through some of Alaska's most arduous areas from Nome to Candle and back. The International Sled Dog Racing Association lists the winners of the first and the third races:  "The winning driver [the first] year was John Hegness, with a time of 119 hours, 15 minutes, and 12 seconds. By 1910, entries had increased considerably, as had the speed of the teams. The winner of [the third] race was John (Iron Man) Johnson, with an (as yet) unbroken record time of 74 hours, 14 minutes, and 37 seconds."

John Johnson ran a team of all Siberian Huskies, though he was not the owner of the dogs. The owner was a Scotsman named Charles Fox Maule Ramsay who had taken notice of the Siberian Huskies that had been used by a team in the 1909 race.  His other teams, also led by Siberian Huskies, won both the second and fourth places in the race. Due to their small size and docile nature the breed had not been thought of as worthy competitors,  but after that they dominated racing for a decade capturing some of the most prestigious Alaska racing titles, especially in rugged terrain where the breed was known for their endurance capability.  Siberian Huskies were further popularized in 1925 when the city of Nome was stricken with a diphtheria epidemic and medical supplies were urgently needed. In what came to be known as the “Great Race of Mercy,” 20 mushers and 150 sled dogs transported the diphtheria antitoxin 674 miles across Alaska in a record-breaking five and a half days. The mushers and their dogs became instantly famous across the United States, especially the dog that lead the team on the final 55 mile stretch into Nome, a Siberian Husky named Balto.

Races
Sled dog races include "sprint" races over relatively short distances of 4 to 100 miles, mid-distance races from 100 to 300 miles, or long-distance races of 300 to over 1,000 miles (Iditarod). Sprint races frequently are two or three-day events with heats run on successive days with the same dogs over the same course. Mid-distance races are continuous events of 100 to 300 miles. (These categories are informal and may overlap to a certain extent.) Long-distance races may be continuous or stage races, in which participants run a different course each day, usually from a central staging location.

Races are categorized not only by distance, but by the maximum number of dogs allowed in each team. The most usual categories are four-dog, six-dog, eight-dog, ten-dog, and unlimited (also called open), although other team size categories can be found.

One example of a dog race is the American Dog Derby, which was first started in 1917.  Competitors enter a 20, 40, 60 or 100-mile category. The race starts in Ashton, Idaho.

Races are organized either as "timed starts," or "mass start." In a timed start, teams start one after another in equal time intervals,  competing against the clock rather than directly against one another. This simplifies some logistical considerations such as that of getting many teams of excited sleddogs to the starting line simultaneously. In mass starts, all of the dog teams start simultaneously. Mass starts are popular in Europe and many parts of Canada. Some mass start events can have up to 30 teams (300 dogs) start all at once.

Although some races are unsanctioned, held under the sole guidance of a local club, many races fall under one of three international organizations. In the United States and Canada, ISDRA (International Sled Dog Racing Association) sanctions many races. In Europe ESDRA (European Sled Dog Racing Association) provides sanctioning, and the IFSS (International Federation of Sleddog Sports) sanctions World Cup races all over the world, as well as a world championship race every two years.

For the race to be sanctioned, a variety of rules must be followed. For example, the ISDRA sanctioning rules specify that all hazards must be avoided, distances must be reported correctly, and the trail must be clearly described to the competitors. The racers have a duty to treat their dogs humanely, and performance-enhancing substances are strictly forbidden.

Dryland Dog Sled Racing is a variant where competitors use a rig (3–4-wheeled cart with a locking brake and handle/steering wheel), a scooter, a bicycle (Bikejoring), or remain on foot (Canicross), racing on packed dirt trails instead of snow. Another mode of dogsled racing is the freight race, in which a specified weight per dog is carried in the sled. This type of race only has about 1 to 5 dogs pulling the sled or scooter at one time.

There is also a huge following in the UK with the British Siberian Husky Racing Association providing premier racing on top-class trails.

American Dog Derby

The American Dog Derby is the oldest dogsled race in the United States and was the first dogsled race that rose to international prominence. Begun in 1917 and heavily promoted by Union Pacific Railroad, it was on par with the Kentucky Derby and with the Indianapolis 500 in terms of interest and press coverage in the early part of the 20th century and was considered to be the world championship dogsled race. American Dog Derby mushers were international celebrities to such degree that one photogenic female musher named Lydia Hutchinson was tapped by a producer to star in his movie. She may have been on her way to being a movie star when she died of pneumonia in 1930. The American Dog Derby popularized dogsled racing in the 1920s and other dogsled races were organized in towns and cities across North America and Northern Europe in its wake.

Iditarod

The most famous long-distance race is the Iditarod Trail Sled Dog Race. Also known as the "Last Great Race on Earth", the Iditarod is roughly 1000 miles of some of the roughest and most beautiful terrain in the world. The race consists of fierce mountains, frozen rivers, thick forests, and desolate tundras. Each team of 12–16 dogs must go from Anchorage all the way to Nome.

Although each musher has different strategies, each team must have certain pieces of equipment, such as an arctic parka, an ax, snowshoes, and boots for each dog's feet to protect against cutting ice and hard packed snow injuries.

The dog sled

Racing sleddogs wear individual harnesses to which "tuglines" are snapped, pulling from a loop near the root of the tail. The dogs are hooked in pairs, their tuglines being attached in turn to a central "gangline". The lines usually include short "necklines" snapped to each dog's collar, just to keep the dogs in proper position. It is unusual ever to see more than 22 dogs hooked at once in a racing team, and that number is usually seen only on the first day of the most highly competitive sprint events. Dogs may be omitted from the teams on subsequent days, but none may be added. Many other rules apply, most of which have been in effect since the beginning of organized dogsled racing in the city of Nome, Alaska, in 1908.

Sled dog racing in South Africa 
In December 2013 the South Gauteng High Court confirmed sled dog racing as a form of dog racing, and therefore sled dog racing was declared illegal in South Africa.

See also
Pedigree Stage Stop Race, the second largest sled dog race in the United States
List of sled dog races
George Attla, champion dog musher
John Beargrease, whose legendary dog sled runs are remembered and celebrated in the annual 411-mile John Beargrease Dog Sled Race between Duluth and Grand Portage, Minnesota.
Mushing

References

External links

 

Animal racing
Dog sledding
Dog sledding races
Dog sports
Snow sports
Former Winter Olympic sports